AeroCaribe de Honduras is an airline in Honduras. Its destinations are:
 Guanaja's Guanaja Airport
 La Ceiba's Golosón International Airport
 Puerto Lempira's Puerto Lempira Airport

It operates one LET-410 UVPE
and one Cessna 206
.

References

External links
"Transport in La Ceiba", Lonely Planet
Website: https://www.aerocaribehn.com/

Airlines of Honduras